Shubh Mangal Savdhan is a Marathi movie released on 11 June 1992 produced and directed by M.S.Salvi.

Cast 

 Ashok Saraf
 Varsha Usgaonkar
 Laxmikant Berde
 Asha Kale
 Nilu Phule
 Ravi Patwardhan
Daya Dongre
Sudhir Dalvi
 Leela Gandhi
 Uday Tikekar
 Mohan Kotiwan
 Lata Arun
 Vasant Shinde
 Maya Jadhav
Rekha Rao

Soundtrack
The music is provided by Ashok Patki.

References

External links 
  Movie Details - gomolo.com
  Movie Album - raaga.com
 Movie Review - mouthshut.com

1992 films
1990s Marathi-language films